Aurora Marion (born 22 December 1985) is a Belgian stage and film actress. She began working in theatre after developing an interest in acting, before making her film debut in Almayer's Folly (2011), which earned her a Magritte Award nomination in the category of Most Promising Actress. The film was directed by Chantal Akerman and is an adaptation of Joseph Conrad's 1895 novel of the same name. 

Marion later starred in Stephan Streker's film A Wedding (2016), which premiered at the 2016 Toronto International Film Festival. At the 8th Magritte Awards, the film received eight nominations and won two, including Best Supporting Actress for Marion. She portrayed Noor Inayat Khan in the BBC series Doctor Who.

Selected filmography

References

External links

1985 births
Living people
Belgian film actresses
People from Uccle
Magritte Award winners
21st-century Belgian actresses